Slam: The Soundtrack is the soundtrack to Marc Levin's 1998 film Slam. It was released on October 13, 1998 through Epic Records and consists entirely of hip hop music. The album peaked at number 84 on the Billboard 200 and at number 24 on the Top R&B/Hip-Hop Albums in the United States.

Track listing

Sample credits
Track 2 contains samples from "Sunshine" by Earth, Wind & Fire
Track 4 contains samples from "Rainbow Ride" by The Charlie Daniels Band
Track 5 contains samples from "Under the Influence of Love" by Love Unlimited
Track 6 contains a sample of "One to One" by Brass Construction
Track 9 contains samples from "Rock Creek Park" by The Blackbyrds

Charts

References

External links

1998 soundtrack albums
Hip hop soundtracks
Epic Records soundtracks
Albums produced by KRS-One
Albums produced by Mathematics
Albums produced by Havoc (musician)
Albums produced by Q-Tip (musician)
Drama film soundtracks